Anja Šimpraga (born 23 July 1987) is a Croatian politician serving as a Deputy Prime Minister of Croatia and a minister without portfolio in charge of social affairs and human and minority rights since 29 April 2022. Previously, she served as a member of the Croatian Parliament from 2020 to 2022. An ethnic Serb, Šimpraga is a member of the Independent Democratic Serb Party (SDSS).

Biography 
Šimpraga was born on 23 July 1987 in Knin, in the SR Croatia, SFR Yugoslavia. During the Croatian War of Independence, Knin was controlled by the separatist Republic of Serbian Krajina until the Operation Storm in 1995 when the Croatian Army regained control of Knin and the rest of Krajina. Following the operation, Šimpraga became a refugee, fleeing Knin to Serbia with her family. Šimpraga later returned to Croatia and became a member of the Independent Democratic Serb Party (SDSS) at the age of 18.

She graduated at the Faculty of Agriculture, University of Zagreb and later obtained a degree in food technology from the Marko Marulić Polytechnic University in Knin.

From 2016 to 2020, Šimpraga was the deputy prefect of the Šibenik-Knin County. She was sworn in as a member of the Croatian Parliament following the appointment of SDSS MP Boris Milošević as a government minister. On 31 July 2020, five days before the 25th anniversary of the liberation of Knin and the Victory Day, Šimpraga spoke in front of the Parliament about her experience as an eight-year-old in the column of Operation Storm refugees. Due to the lack of discourse in Croatia on civilian Serb victims of Operation Storm, Šimpraga's speech was widely dubbed "important", "powerful" and "historical". On 29 April 2022, Šimpraga was appointed a deputy prime minister of Croatia and a minister without portfolio in charge of social affairs and human and minority rights, succeeding Milošević who once again became an MP.

Personal life 
Šimpraga is married and lives in Radučić.

References 

1987 births
Living people
People from Knin
Serbs of Croatia
Yugoslav Wars refugees
21st-century Croatian women politicians
Independent Democratic Serb Party politicians
Government ministers of Croatia